A bolster is a long narrow pillow or cushion filled with cotton, down or fibre. Bolsters are usually firm for back or arm support or for decorative application. They are not a standard size or shape and commonly have a zipper or hook-and-loop enclosure. A foam insert is sometimes used for additional support. A bolster is also referred to as a cushion, a pillow and a prop. A bolster pillow is a common shape for lace pillows.

Etymology
The word is from both Middle and Old English, and is a cognate of the Old English , 'bag'. The first known use of the word bolster was before the 12th century.

Southeast and South Asia
In Southeast Asian countries, in particular Vietnam, the Philippines, Indonesia, Cambodia, Malaysia, Myanmar, Singapore, and Thailand, the bolster is designed to be hugged when sleeping. Malaysians call it  ('hug pillow'), and Indonesians call it  ('roll pillow'). In Indonesia, it is also known colloquially as a Dutch Wife.

East Asia 

Bolsters are called dakimakura in Japan. Tradition suggests that a wife would fashion the bolster made of bamboo and give it to her husband when he travelled away from home so that he would not be lonely at night, hence the alternative terms bamboo wife, Dutch wife, or chikufujin. It is believed that the pillow was invented by Dutch colonialists which is why it is also referred to as Dutch wife.

A  is used in the summer months to cool down while sleeping, since its hollow construction from thin bamboo strips allows air to flow through the pillow. A person tightly wraps their arms and legs around the  while sleeping.

Western countries 
In western countries, a bolster is usually placed at the head of one's bed and functions as head or lower back support, or as an arm support on furniture with high rigid sides. Bolster pillows are also used as bumpers in cribs and for lounging on the floor in family and children's rooms.

In the United States, body pillows resemble bolsters and are designed to be hugged when sleeping.

References

Bedding